Mick and Mac is a British comedy series, which aired on BBC Television in 1990 starring Michael Barrymore.

References

1990 British television series debuts
1990 British television series endings
1990s British children's television series
British children's comedy television series
BBC television sitcoms
English-language television shows
BBC children's television shows
Michael Barrymore